Yosami Transmitting Station was a very large transmitting station for intercontinental communication and for submarine communication in the VLF-range at Kariya, Aichi, Japan. Yosami Transmitting Station used as antenna a wire antenna system, which was spun between 8 guyed masts, each 250 metres tall and insulated against ground. The masts of Yosami transmitting station were at its completion in 1929 Japan's tallest architectural structure.
Yosami Transmitting Station played an important role in World War II for transmitting news to Germany and Italy and for transmitting messages to submarines under water.

After 1950 the transmitters were used by the US Navy. Although the masts were repainted in 1985, the station shut down in 1993 and became a beautiful flower park. However, the transmitter and building as well as the bottom section of one of the masts were moved and rebuilt as a museum a short way from the original site.

External links
 Denki Kogyo Ltd: History of the Yosami Transmitting Station
 Yosami Radio Transmitting Station
 City Kariya: Yosami Museum
 Yosami pictures
 Great photos by JA2DJN
 Transmitter and Antenna system schematics
 Antenna scheme
 Yosami Transmitting Station

Towers in Japan
Infrastructure completed in 1929
1929 establishments in Japan
1996 disestablishments in Japan
Military facilities in Aichi Prefecture
Demolished buildings and structures in Japan